Glebe Point is a point on Sydney Harbour in the suburb of Glebe, in the Inner West of Sydney, in the state of New South Wales, Australia.

External links 
 GlebeNet: Information for Residents and Visitors to Glebe, Sydney 

Sydney Harbour
Headlands of New South Wales